Elm Street station is a SEPTA Regional Rail station in Norristown, Pennsylvania. Located at Elm and Markley Streets, it is the last stop on the Norristown section of the Manayunk/Norristown Line. It includes a 219-space parking lot. In FY 2013, Elm Street station had a weekday average of 300 boardings and 257 alightings. The freight-only Stony Creek Branch passes the station to the west.

Station layout

References

External links
 SEPTA – Norristown Elm Street Station
 Station from Google Maps Street View

SEPTA Regional Rail stations
Norristown, Pennsylvania
Former Reading Company stations
Railway stations in Montgomery County, Pennsylvania